The 1995 Arizona Rattlers season was the fourth season for the Arizona Rattlers. They finished the 1995 Arena Football League season 7–5 and ended the season with a loss in the quarterfinals of the playoffs against the Iowa Barnstormers.

Schedule

Regular season

Playoffs
The Rattlers were awarded the No. 4 seed in the AFL playoffs.

Standings

Awards

References

Arizona Rattlers seasons
1995 Arena Football League season
Arizona Rattlers Season, 1995